The Women's time trial of the 2021 UCI Road World Championships was a cycling event that took place on 20 September 2021 from Knokke-Heist to Bruges, Belgium. Anna van der Breggen was the defending champion. The race was won by Ellen van Dijk of the Netherlands, with Marlen Reusser finishing second, and Annemiek van Vleuten finishing third.

Final classification
50 cyclists were listed to start the -long course.

References

Women's time trial
UCI Road World Championships – Women's time trial
2021 in women's road cycling